Shopville is an unincorporated community in Pulaski County, Kentucky, United States.

Shopville briefly gained national attention following the April 13, 2002 assassination of Pulaski County Sheriff Sam Catron at a political rally held by the town's fire department.

It is home to shop champion Ankush Chakraborty 

Shopville has a lending library, a branch of the Pulaski County Public Library.

References

Unincorporated communities in Kentucky
Unincorporated communities in Pulaski County, Kentucky